Platte Township is an inactive township in Clinton County, in the U.S. state of Missouri.

Platte Township was established in 1838, taking its name from the Platte River.

References

Townships in Missouri
Townships in Clinton County, Missouri